Hattat Aziz Efendi (born 1871, Maçka – August 16, 1934, İstanbul) was an Ottoman calligrapher.

Life and work

Born Mehmed Abdulaziz Efendi, in Maçka in 1871, his family moved to Istanbul, the Ottoman capital during Russo-Turkish War (1877–78). Aziz Efendi completed his primary education in 1885 and started to learn calligraphy from Ahmed Arif Effendi of Plovdiv (known more commonly as "Bakkal" -the grocer-) and he also studied at Hat Mektebi (Calligraphy School). He graduated in 1894 and continued to practise under the supervision of Muhsinzade Abdullah Hamdi Efendi until 1896.
 
In 1921, King Fuad of Egypt invited him to Cairo, where he transcribed the Quran and gilded the result. After completing his mission, he remained in Egypt, where he worked as a teacher and contributed to the establishment of schools to improve Arabic fonts.

He returned to Istanbul in 1932, where he died two years later.

Two of his calligraphic panels are hanging in the Grand Mosque of Bursa, Turkey. He transcribed 11 copies of the Quran in his lifetime, a number of hilyas and other textual compilations.

Examples of works

See also
Culture of the Ottoman Empire
Islamic calligraphy
List of Ottoman calligraphers
Ottoman art

References

External links
 A profile of Hattat Aziz Efendi by Muhittin Serin. (in Turkish)
 Muhittin Serin: Hattat Aziz Efendi, Istanbul (1988, 1999), 
 Sâmiha Ayverdi, İbrâhim Efendi konağı,  Kubbealti Publishing (2009), 147ff. (p. 147 has a portrait photograph)

Further reading
 Muhittin Serin, Hattat Aziz Efendi, Istanbul, Kubbealti, 1999 

1934 deaths
1871 births
Calligraphers from the Ottoman Empire
People from Maçka
Turkish expatriates in Egypt